Elizabeth Oluchi Anyanacho (born 9 April 1999) is a Nigerian taekwondo athlete. She participated at the 2019 African Games, winning a bronze medal at 67 kg. She qualified for the 2020 Summer Olympics, although she had not intended to compete at the Olympics until 2024. She would have been the first Nigerian to compete in her sport for 16 years if the Olympics had not been postponed. The previous competitor was Princess Dudu in 2004.

Life
She won the 2019 Nigeria Open in Abuja, defeating Judith Usifoh.

In August 2020, she was featured in the Malala Fund's "Game Changers" project, a series featuring 30 female athletes worldwide who defy convention on and off the field.

References

External links
 

1999 births
Living people
Nigerian female taekwondo practitioners
Competitors at the 2019 African Games
African Games competitors for Nigeria
Taekwondo practitioners at the 2020 Summer Olympics
Olympic taekwondo practitioners of Nigeria
African Games medalists in taekwondo
African Taekwondo Championships medalists
21st-century Nigerian women
African Games bronze medalists for Nigeria